Jorge Habegger (born 19 October 1946) is an Argentinian football coach.

Career 
Habegger started his career as coach in Colombia. He has trained clubs in Argentina, Bolivia, Saudi Arabia, Ecuador and Guatemala.

References

External links 
 http://www.jorgehabegger.com/
https://www.footballdatabase.eu/en/player/details/231714-jorge-habegger Retrieved 5/16/2020.

Living people
Argentine football managers
Expatriate football managers in Bolivia
Expatriate football managers in Saudi Arabia
Expatriate football managers in Ecuador
Expatriate football managers in Guatemala
Argentine expatriate football managers
Argentine expatriate sportspeople in Bolivia
Argentine expatriate sportspeople in Saudi Arabia
Argentine expatriate sportspeople in Ecuador
Argentine expatriate sportspeople in Guatemala
1946 births
Deportivo Español managers
Club Bolívar managers
Bolivia national football team managers
Barcelona S.C. managers
Boca Juniors managers
Club Atlético Huracán managers
C.D. Jorge Wilstermann managers
The Strongest managers
Al Nassr FC managers
Ettifaq FC managers
Deportivo Municipal managers
L.D.U. Loja managers
Club Aurora managers